Charadraula parcella is a moth in the family Autostichidae. It was described by Julius Lederer in 1855. It is found in Syria and Israel.

References

Moths described in 1855
Holcopogoninae